Honor Among Lovers is a 1931 American pre-Code drama film made by Paramount Pictures, directed by Dorothy Arzner. The film stars Claudette Colbert, Fredric March, Monroe Owsley, Charles Ruggles and Ginger Rogers.

Plot

Julia Traynor (Claudette Colbert) is a highly efficient personal secretary, managing nearly everything for her boss, Wall Street trader Jerry Stafford (Fredric March). Julia's fiancé Philip Craig (Monroe Owsley) works in Wall Street as well. Monty Dunn (Charlie Ruggles), a friend of Jerry, is linked with Doris Brown (Ginger Rogers). Jerry wants to be more than Julia's boss, but she loves Philip. After Jerry persists in pursuing her, Julia decides to marry Philip; Jerry fires her.

A year later, Julia invites Jerry to her first anniversary party. He immediately falls for her again and kisses her. Monty tells Philip that their investment in silk has failed; Philip makes a scene, and admits to Julia that he'd been embezzling money from Jerry and other investors. Julia asks Jerry for money to keep Philip out of jail, which he provides, but after an angry row in which Philip accuses Julia of selling herself for the money, she leaves him. Philip goes to Jerry's home, expecting to find Julia there; when he doesn't, he shoots Jerry and flees. Julia is apprehended by police on the train to Washington, D.C., after Philip tells them that she shot Jerry.

When Julia and Philip are alone, Philip confesses to Julia, and his confession is recorded by the police. However, Jerry declines to prosecute, and Philip is acquitted. When he and Julia arrive home, she has already packed her things, having decided to leave him. Jerry arrives to help Julia, and they leave together, talking about taking a trip to France.

Cast
Claudette Colbert as Julia Traynor
Fredric March as Jerry Stafford
Monroe Owsley as Philip Craig
Charles Ruggles as Monty Dunn
Ginger Rogers as Doris Brown
Avonne Taylor as Maybelle Worthington
Pat J. O'Brien as Conroy
Janet McLeary as Margaret Newton
Ralph Morgan as Riggs
Leonard Carey as Forbes, Butler
Winifred Harris as Party Guest
Charles Halton as Wilkes
Granville Bates as Clark

References

External links
 
 
 
 

1931 films
American black-and-white films
Paramount Pictures films
1931 drama films
Films directed by Dorothy Arzner
American drama films
1930s American films